Pirelli General were a long-running and highly successful works football club based in Eastleigh, Hampshire. For a spell they were the top club in the town and played in the Hampshire League for many years until their unfortunate demise in 2003.

History

Pirelli General FC were founded in 1916 as the works side of the Pirelli General cable making company. They initially played in the Winchester & District and Eastleigh Leagues before transferring to the larger Southampton League.

By 1933 the club were playing at Dew Lane (a lovely venue, fondly locally known as 'Eastleigh Wembley') and were fielding six sides and had been elected to the Hampshire League Division 2 where they finished runners-up in their debut season before winning the title the following year and establishing themselves in Division 1.

Once normal football had resumed after World War II, Pirelli's returned to the county league where they were placed in Division 2 and 'The Cablemen' were regular FA Cup entrants at this time, although never progressing beyond the preliminary rounds. However, despite winning the Hampshire Intermediate Cup in 1955–56, it was not until 1962–63 that Pirelli's returned to top flight when they won the Division 2 title.

In 1965 Pirelli's moved to their best known home ground at Chestnut Avenue in Eastleigh and with some good facilities the club remained a steady Division 1 outfit, twice finishing 3rd in the late sixties.

The seventies was the golden age for Pirelli's, especially the 1971–72 season when they were Division 1 Champions. The next fourteen years saw the club remain regular title contenders and in 1976–77 they caused a big upset when they defeated favourites Farnborough Town 1-0 to win the Hampshire Senior Cup.

In 1986 the Wessex League was formed (mostly by the Hampshire League's top clubs) but Pirelli's remained with the county league and were again champions in 1992–93.

Despite the parent company moving out of Eastleigh, Pirelli's remained a prominent force in the Hampshire League until the controversial loss of their ground in 2003 saw the club reluctantly withdraw from the competition and fold.

The saddest aspect about the club's demise, was that their much loved home ground at Chestnut Avenue sat unused until 2010 when local Hampshire League side AFC Stoneham took up residence.

Honours
Hampshire League Division 1
Champions 1971/72 and 1992/93
Hampshire League Division 2
Champions 1934/35 and 1962/63
Runners-up 1933/34 and 1946/47
Hampshire FA Senior Cup 
Winners 1976/77 
Finalists 1968/69 and 1977/78
Hampshire FA Intermediate Cup 
Winners 1955/56
Southampton FA Senior Cup
Winners 1932/33, 1935/36, 1965/66 and 1989/90
Finalists 1933/34
Southampton League Senior Division
Champions 1932/33
All England Cable Makers Cup
Winners 1951/52, 1974/75 and 1978/79

Playing Records

League

FA Cup

FA Vase

External links
Pirelli General Cables on Football Club History Database
Pirelli General on Football Club History Database
Pirelli General Reserves on Football Club History Database
Halcyon Days of the Cablemen

Defunct football clubs in England
Defunct football clubs in Hampshire
Eastleigh
Association football clubs established in 1916
Association football clubs disestablished in 2003
1916 establishments in England
2003 disestablishments in England
Winchester and District Saturday Football League
Hampshire League
Works association football teams in England